Thompson and Meserve's Purchase is a township in Coös County, New Hampshire, United States. The purchase lies entirely within the White Mountain National Forest. As of the 2020 census, the population of the purchase was 1.

In New Hampshire, locations, grants, townships (which are different from towns), and purchases are unincorporated portions of a county which are not part of any town and have limited self-government (if any, as many are uninhabited).

Thompson and Meserve's Purchase is notable for encompassing the northern slope of Mount Washington, including a large portion of the Mount Washington Auto Road and Cog Railway.

History 
Thompson and Meserve's Purchase was sold by Commissioner Willey to Samuel W. Thompson of Conway and George P. Meserve of Jackson, New Hampshire, in 1855 for $500.

Geography 
To the east of the Presidential peaks lies the Great Gulf, a deep glacial cirque. The Appalachian Trail crosses the purchase, close to the crest of the Presidential Range.

The west side of the purchase is drained by the headwaters of the Ammonoosuc River, including its tributaries Clay Brook and Jefferson Brook, while the northwest corner of the purchase is drained by streams that flow north to the Israel River. Both the Ammonoosuc and the Israel River are part of the Connecticut River watershed. The east side of the purchase is drained by the West Branch of the Peabody River, coming out of the Great Gulf and part of the Androscoggin River watershed.

Demographics 

As of the 2020 census, there was one person recorded to be living in the purchase.

References

Townships in Coös County, New Hampshire
Berlin, New Hampshire micropolitan area
Townships in New Hampshire